Juan Moreira is a 1936 Argentine historical action film directed by Nelo Cosimi and starring Antonio Podestá, Domingo Sapelli and Guillermo Casali. The film is an adaptation of the 1879 novel Juan Moreira by Eduardo Gutiérrez, portraying the life of the nineteenth century guacho and outlaw Juan Moreira.

Cast
 Antonio Podestá 
 Domingo Sapelli 
 Guillermo Casali
 María Esther Podestá
 Adolfo Almeida 
 Amalia Brian 
 Juan Carula 
 Raúl Castro
 Mario O. Catalán 
 Max Citelli 
 Patrocinio Díaz 
 Néstor Feria 
 Alberto Gómez 
 Herminia Mancini
 Sarita Natle 
 Antonio Podestá 
 Samuel Sanda
 Yola Yoli

References

Bibliography 
 Goble, Alan. The Complete Index to Literary Sources in Film. Walter de Gruyter, 1999.

External links 

1936 films
Argentine historical action films
1930s historical action films
1930s Spanish-language films
Films directed by Nelo Cosimi
Films set in the 19th century
Films set in Argentina
Films based on Argentine novels
Argentine black-and-white films
1930s Argentine films